"I Kissed a Girl" is a song by Katy Perry.

I Kissed a Girl may also refer to:

"I Kissed a Girl" (Jill Sobule song)
"I Kissed a Girl" (Glee), the seventh episode from the third season of the Glee television series
I Kissed a Girl (film), a 2015 French comedy film